Abdul Ali Bahari is a Kenyan politician. A member of the Kenya African National Union, Ali was elected to represent the Isiolo South Constituency in the National Assembly of Kenya in the 2007 parliamentary election.

References

Living people
Year of birth missing (living people)
Kenya African National Union politicians
Members of the National Assembly (Kenya)